Slab Fork is an unincorporated community in Raleigh County, West Virginia, United States with a population of 202. Slab Fork is located along a stream of the same name and West Virginia Route 54.  The ZIP code for Slab Fork is 25920.

Demographics
The community's percentage of married households is lower than the national average, 
but the percentage of families (households with children) is higher than the national average. The median income in Slab Fork is approximately $33,500, which is 20% lower than the national average. As of the 2000 United States Census, none of the residents had received a college degree. According to the 2000 census, 199 of the community's 202 residents were white, two were of mixed race, and one was an Alaskan native or American Indian.

Notable people
 Billy Arnold, professional boxer

 Earl Francis, Major League Baseball pitcher
 Doris Payne, noted jewel thief
 Bill Withers, Grammy Award-winning singer-songwriter

References

Unincorporated communities in Raleigh County, West Virginia
Unincorporated communities in West Virginia
Coal towns in West Virginia